Susanne Lebek (born 5 November 1986) is a German dressage rider. She won a team bronze medal at the 2009 FEI European Championships aboard Potomac.

References

External links
 

Living people
1986 births
German female equestrians
German dressage riders